John Poyntz (ca. 14851544) was an English courtier and politician, Member of Parliament for Devizes in 1529.

Poyntz was the second son of Sir Robert Poyntz of Iron Acton, Gloucestershire, by Margaret, an illegitimate daughter of Anthony Woodville, 2nd Earl Rivers, making Margaret a first cousin of King Henry VIII. Dame Margaret Poyntz was appointed to wait on Catherine of Aragon in October 1501.

John Poyntz married, by 1528, Elizabeth, the daughter of Sir Matthew Browne of Betchworth Castle, Surrey.

Poyntz was sewer to Queen Catherine of Aragon in 1520. He was friends with the poet Sir Thomas Wyatt who wrote a satire on ‘mine own John Poyntz’. A painting and a drawing of Poyntz by Holbein survive.

He was the brother of vice-admiral Anthony Poyntz and the uncle of Nicholas Poyntz.

References

1485 births
1544 deaths
English MPs 1529–1536